Werksmans Attorneys is a South African law firm with offices in Johannesburg, Cape Town and Stellenbosch. It was established in the early 1900s. In 1993, Werksmans was one of the founding members of LEX Africa, currently the oldest and largest African network.

The firm has recently been considered as the latest a member of the "Big Five law firms" of leading South African law firms.

Practice areas
With a focus on corporate and commercial law, the firm's practice areas include banking and finance; business recovery, insolvency, and restructuring; competition law; labour law; environmental law;  health, pharmaceutical, and life sciences; and mining,  energy, and natural resources. It also provides legal advisory services for intellectual property, litigation and dispute resolution (and alternative dispute resolution in the form of mediation and arbitration), media and communications, mergers and acquisitions, property transactions, sports and entertainment, tax, and information technology.

In the news
In November 2019, the firm was representing celebrity Boity Thulo in her legal attempt to terminate her contract with her management agency.

After an apparent issue with non-payment of fees, Werksmans severed ties with its client the Passenger Rail Agency of South Africa in February 2020.

References

Law firms established in 1917
Companies based in Johannesburg
Law firms of South Africa
1917 establishments in South Africa